Beaminster Forum & Redhone Hundred was a hundred in the county of Dorset, England, containing the following parishes:

Beaminster
Bradpole
Chedington
Chardstock (transferred to Devon 1896)
Corscombe
Mapperton
Mosterton
Netherbury
North Poorton
South Perrott
Stoke Abbott
Toller Porcorum (part)
Wambrook (transferred to Somerset 1895)

See also
List of hundreds in Dorset

Sources
Boswell, Edward, 1833: The Civil Division of the County of Dorset (published on CD by Archive CD Books Ltd, 1992)
Hutchins, John, History of Dorset, vols 1-4 (3rd ed 1861–70; reprinted by EP Publishing, Wakefield, 1973)
Mills, A. D., 1977, 1980, 1989: Place Names of Dorset, parts 1–3. English Place Name Society: Survey of English Place Names vols LII, LIII and 59/60

Beaminster
Hundreds of Dorset